Heather Dawn Bright, also known by her stage name Bright Lights, is an American singer, songwriter, DJ and record producer.

Early life 
Bright, whose father was a pastor during most of her childhood, began her music career singing in churches at a very early age. At 19, she moved to Boston, Massachusetts to pursue a recording career and attend Berklee College of Music. In 2005, she was chosen to appear as a contestant on the UPN reality TV series Road To Stardom with Missy Elliott, where she competed for a recording contract. Following her appearance on the show, Bright moved to New York City where she began her career as a songwriter.

Career 

Bright's first release came in 2009 with Ashley Tisdale's "Hot Mess" off her second studio album Guilty Pleasure. Guilty Pleasure debuted at No. 12 on the Billboard 200 charts. She went on to write for a host of other artists including Britney Spears, Usher, Toni Braxton, The Wanted, Far East Movement, Karmin, and Allison Iraheta. Her most successful song to date is Justin Bieber's single "Somebody To Love" which peaked at No. 15 on the Billboard Hot 100 charts and reached Top 10 in Canada. "Somebody To Love" was the second single off Bieber's album, My World 2.0.

In addition to her songwriting career, Bright Lights is also an artist in the electronic genre. Her first artist release came in 2010 with producer Justin Michael. The song, "Trouble", was released through Ultra Records and garnered the "hot shot debut" on the Billboard dance charts, eventually peaking at No. 22. She has since written and recorded several hits in the electronic dance field including Porter Robinson's "Language", Hardwell's and Dyro's "Never Say Goodbye", and 3LAU's "How You Love Me". She was also featured on Zedd's Clarity album. Her first solo record "Runaway" landed at number 5 on the Billboard Dance Charts and featured 3LAU.

She has performed at many dance venues and festivals around the world including Ultra Music Festival and Electric Daisy Carnival.

Discography

As lead artist

Featured artist credits

Songwriting credits

References

External links
 

Living people
People from Spartanburg, South Carolina
American women singer-songwriters
1982 births
21st-century American women singers
Singer-songwriters from South Carolina